Dopasia ludovici, Ludovic’s glass lizard, is a species of lizard of the Anguidae family. It is found in Vietnam.

References

Dopasia
Reptiles described in 1905
Endemic fauna of Vietnam
Reptiles of Vietnam
Taxa named by François Mocquard